Kali Bari Mandir is a Hindu temple situated on Bantony Hill, Shimla. The temple is dedicated to fearsome reincarnation of Goddess Kali, known as Shyamala, after which the Shimla city is named. The goddess is believed to have existed near Jakhoo.

History 
Kali Bari temple was originally built in 1845 by a Bengali Brahmin Ram Charan Brahamchari in the vicinity of Rothney Castle on Jakhoo Hill. That's why it resembles the Dakshineswar Kali Temple in Kolkata. It is one of the ancient temples of the city and features a unique Hindu-style architecture along with blue coloured wooden idol of goddess Kali. Later, the British shifted the location of the temple to Bantony Hill. The temple trust formed in 1902 mainly consists of Bengali members.

View 
The temple is located in middle of the city center. It has a beautiful scenic charm of the city as well as of nature. Shimla's Old Bus Stand, ARTRAC, Annadale, Railway Board Building, Shimla Railway Station, Shri Hanuman Jakhu can be seen from the temple premises. The temple attracts a lot of tourists and devotees.

References 

Tourist attractions in Shimla
Temples in India
Hindu temples in Himachal Pradesh
Buildings and structures in Shimla
Temples_in_Shimla
British-era buildings in Himachal Pradesh